Samursky National Park is located on the west coast of the Caspian Sea, at the eastern extent of the Greater Caucasus Mountains in Dagestan, Russia.  It is divided into two sectors: a coastal floodplain section on the delta of the Samur River, and a mountainous sector that includes Mount Bazardüzü and the southernmost extreme point in Russia.  The coastal sector is notable for supporting a temperate-subtropical liana (widespread vines) forest.  The park also protects near-shore waters of the Caspian.
  The park was officially created in 2019.

Topography
The Samura Delta sector (10,134 km2) occupies most of the Samur River delta in the southeast of Dagestan, on the border with Azerbaijan.  It lies in Derbentsky District and Magaramkentsky District.  The terrain is flat, with shifting river branches, spring streams, coastal lakes, lagoons, and beaches.  This sector includes the Samur liana forest, and an offshore strip of shallow water in the Caspian Sea.  

The mountain sector "Shalbuzdag" (38,139 km2) lies on the northern slopes of the Caucasus Mountains, forming the Bazardyuzi-Shalbuzdag highlands.  Major peaks include Mount Bazardüzü, Mount Yuradag, and Mount Shalbuzdag. This sector is located in Dokuzparinsky District and Akhtynsky District. The southern border of this sector is also on the border between Russia and Azerbaijan.

Ecoregion and climate
The park is at the eastern extremity of the Caucasus mixed forests ecoregion.  Because of differences of altitude zones, the mountainous sector rises above the forest zone. 

The climate of Samur delta sector is Humid continental climate, warm wet summer (Köppen climate classification (Cfa)). This climate is characterized by large seasonal temperature differentials. Precipitation is relatively even throughout the year. Higher elevations in the mountainous sector are colder.

Plants and animals
The Samura Delta sector protects the only large liana forests in Russia.  Over 500 species of vascular plants have been identified in the delta, over 1,000 species in the park overall.  The dominant forest trees in the delta are English oak, common hornbeam, white poplar, alder and white willow.  The Samur Delta is an important wintering area for waterfowl and near-water birds.  Over 300 species of birds have been recorded in the park, 130 of which are known to nest in the area.  38% of all species known in Russia have been recorded in this one park.

The Shalbuzdag (mountainous) sector is not forested at the higher elevations, although species diversity is high overall because of the extreme altitude differences.  Immediately below 3,000 meters the landscape is alpine and subalpine steppe meadows.  Above 3,000 meters is scree (talus), bare rock, and glaciers.

See also
 Protected areas of Russia

References

External links

National parks of Russia